Robert Bruce Duff (born May 8, 1971) is an American politician, currently serving as a member of the Connecticut State Senate, where he represents Norwalk and part of Darien in Connecticut's 25th District. He previously served as a member of the Connecticut House of Representatives, representing the 137th District. He is currently Majority Leader of the Connecticut Senate, and serves as chair of the Executive and Legislative Nominations Committee and vice chair of the Legislative Management Committee.

Early life and education 
Duff was born in Norwalk, Connecticut to Bruce and Joanne Duff. He is a fifth-generation resident of Norwalk, Connecticut, however his ancestors were originally settled in Greenwich, Connecticut, hailing from England.

Duff graduated from Norwalk High School in 1989. He attended Lynchburg College, and earned a Bachelor of Science in Political Science in 1993. He worked as a substitute teacher for the Norwalk Public Schools from 1993 to 1995. While in college, Duff was a student senator, and an intern for United States Senator Chris Dodd.

Career 
He was a field coordinator for the John B. Larson for Governor Campaign in 1994. He was a campaign manager in the Norwalk mayoral race in 1995. As serving in the Connecticut General Assembly is a part-time position, most members have full-time jobs. Duff has worked as a realtor for William Pitt Sotheby's International Realty since 1995.

In 2001, he ran in a special election for the seat in the Connecticut House of Representatives left vacant by Alex Knopp when he took office as mayor of Norwalk. He beat Republican Kevin Fitzgerald by 281 votes (1210 -929). He was re-elected in the 2002 general election. As a state Representative, Duff served as the House vice-chair of the Energy & Technology Committee, and as a member of the Banks, Higher Education & Advancement Committee and the Select Committee on Housing.

In 2004, Duff sought the State Senate seat left open by Republican Robert Genuario who became Gov. M. Jodi Rell's budget chief. He ran against Republican Jeff Konspore, chairman of the Norwalk school board.

As a state senator, and prior to becoming Majority Leader in 2015, Duff was Deputy Majority Whip from 2005 to 2006, Majority Whip from 2007 to 2008, Assistant Majority Leader from 2009 to 2012, and Assistant President Pro Tempore from 2013 to 2014.

Private 
Duff is married to Tracey Kathleen (née Krause). They have two children and reside in the Cranbury section of Norwalk, Connecticut.

Awards 

 Legislator of the Year, YMCA of Connecticut, 2003
 Legislator of the Year Award, National Association of Social Workers, Connecticut Chapter, 2005
 Rick Wallace Award of Merit Legislator of the Year Award, Connecticut Association of Not-for-profit Providers for the Aging.

References

External links 
 State Senate Democrats - Bob Duff
 Bob Duff at Ballotpedia
 Bob Duff at Vote Smart
 Connecticut Business and Industry Association
 Bob Duff at Facebook

|-

|-

1971 births
21st-century American politicians
Democratic Party Connecticut state senators
Living people
Democratic Party members of the Connecticut House of Representatives
Norwalk High School (Connecticut) alumni
Politicians from Norwalk, Connecticut
University of Lynchburg alumni